Robert Varga (born 23 September 1941) is a former French cyclist. He competed in the individual and team pursuit events at the 1964 Summer Olympics.

References

External links
 

1941 births
Living people
French male cyclists
Olympic cyclists of France
Cyclists at the 1964 Summer Olympics
People from Échirolles
French track cyclists
Sportspeople from Isère
Cyclists from Auvergne-Rhône-Alpes